U.S. Wings, Inc. or just US Wings is an American resaler specializing in military and aviation equipment, apparel and other accessories. US Wings has been in business since 1986, operating worldwide. It is also an official Defense Logistics Agency supplier and a supplier to US military and government agencies.

Started by Sgt. David Hack, a decorated soldier and successful recruiter (his recruiting Jeep is one of only 2 ever to be displayed in a US Military museum, the other belonging to Gen. George S. Patton) and his wife Lani Hack, US Wings is an official Defense Logistics Agency supplier and a supplier to US military and government agencies. But that doesn't mean you need to drop and do 20 to have access to their great line up. In addition to their website, they operate a store in Hudson where they offer a full selection of military inspired jackets and casual everyday clothing. They even offer Tom Selleck's Aloha Shirt as seen in Magnum P.I.https://bestleather.org/us-wings-signature-series-vintage-cowhide-indy-style-adventurer-jacket-review-489-00/

References 
www.uswings.com
https://bestleather.org/us-wings-signature-series-vintage-cowhide-indy-style-adventurer-jacket-review-489-00/

Defense companies of the United States
Manufacturing companies based in Ohio
Summit County, Ohio